Eisenmenger (German for "ironmonger") is a German surname. Notable people with the surname include:

Arthur Eisenmenger (born 1909 (or 1914, 1915)), German graphic designer
August Eisenmenger (1830-1907), Austrian painter
Johann Andreas Eisenmenger (1654–1704), German orientalist, Antisemite
Rudolf Eisenmenger (1902–1994), Austrian artist, painter
Samuel Eisenmenger, genannt Sideocrates (1534–1585), German physician, theologian and astrologer
Victor Eisenmenger (1864–1932) Austrian medical doctor, known for Eisenmenger's syndrome
Wolfgang Eisenmenger (physicist) (born 1930), German physicist
Wolfgang Eisenmenger (born 1944), German forensic pathologist

See also 
Eisenmenger's syndrome

German-language surnames
Occupational surnames